Envigo (en-VEE-go) is a privately held contract research organization and laboratory animal sourcer  that provides live animals and related products and services to pharmaceutical and biotechnology industries, government, academia and other life science organizations engaged in animal testing. The company breeds and sells research animals – which are referred to in the industry as "research models"– including rodents (mice, rats, hamsters and guinea pigs), rabbits, and non-human primates. Envigo is headquartered in Indianapolis, Indiana and employs more than 1,200 people at 30+ locations across North America, Europe and the Middle East.

Many of Envigo's breeding sites have been accredited by the Association for Assessment and Accreditation of Laboratory Animal Care (AAALAC) International Council including: Horst, the Netherlands (March 29, 2016), Indianapolis, IN, Livermore, CA, Boyertown and Denver, PA, St Louis, MO and others. However, the U.S. Department of Agriculture (USDA) found multiple violations of the Animal Welfare Act at the company's Cumberland, Virginia dog-breading facility and the U.S. Department of Justice filed a complaint against Envigo for the violations in federal court. In a settlement reached in July 2022, the company agreed to no longer engage in activities at the site that require an Animal Welfare Act license and to relinquish the over 4000 beagles at the facility to the Humane Society of the United States.

History 
Envigo was created in September 2015 when Huntingdon Life Sciences, Harlan Laboratories and three subsidiaries (GFA, NDA Analytics and LSR Associates) merged. The combined organization had 3,800 employees at inception with sales approaching $500 million. The company's rebranded name, Envigo, supposedly incorporated the English words enhance, enrich and vigorous. The Latin root of the word vigorous is “vita” meaning “life.”

The company consists of two core business units: Contract Research Services (CRS) and Research Models and Services (RMS). The CRS business unit offers a range of drug development and environmental sciences services, including safety assessment, analytical, metabolism, CMC and regulatory consultancy from nine contract research facilities located in Europe, the United States and Middle East. The RMS business unit provides research models (live animals), lab animal diets and bedding and support services from 30 sites worldwide.

Envigo acquired LabCorp's Covance Research Products business in June 2019, while LabCorp's Covance Drug Development segment acquired Envigo's nonclinical contract research services business.  Both companies continue to collaborate through a multi-year, renewable supply agreement. In December 2019, Envigo acquired Horizon Discovery's research models business unit which provides genetically engineered models from its Boyertown, Pennsylvania and St. Louis, Missouri locations. The business unit uses gene editing expertise to produce customized models with clinically relevant gene deletions, insertions and other modifications which are then used as preclinical models for human disease during drug discovery and development. The two companies announced collaboration to ensure continuity and enable all customers to access CRISPR-edited research models for screening and other applications.

Envigo RMS Holding Corp. was acquired by Inotiv in November 2021. In July 2022, a shareholder filed a class action lawsuit again Inotiv for failing to disclose the effect the Envigo acquisition would have on Inotiv's earnings.

Animal cruelty 
Envigo owned and operated a research and breeding facility in Cumberland, Virginia that housed over 5,000 beagles, bred and sold for medical research. In 2019, PETA conducted an undercover investigation at Envigo's Cumberland facility. The investigation led to a PETA campaign calling for the USDA and other Envigo customers to cut ties with the company. After a routine inspection in July 2021, USDA inspectors cited Envigo for 26 violations of the Animal Welfare Act. Inspectors again cited Envigo for 13 violations, including 11 repeat violations, on a repeat inspection in October 2021. Inspectors noted in their reports that more than 500 dogs were experiencing pain and discomfort, being left in 85-degree heat without air conditioning for up to five hours, and infrequent cleaning left kennels and feeders hounded by insects. More than a dozen dogs were found to have paw and eye injuries, as well as some with “severe dental disease.” In addition, the USDA noted that over a seven-month period, more than 300 puppies died from “unknown causes,” and the facility had kept unfinished records regarding their deaths. As a result of these reports and undercover investigations by local news WRIC-TV and PETA, multiple state legislators in Virginia introduced new legislation that would tighten regulation and subject employees to criminal liability.

After a repeat inspection on March 8, 2022, found five repeat violations, including unsafe conditions, animal injuries, and mold and feces in the food supply, Virginia Senators Mark Warner and Tim Kaine sent a letter to the USDA requesting that the facility's license be temporarily revoked. In a comment regarding the letter, Senator Warner said, "We’ve seen these horrific incidents … it needs to be shut down...Not only do we want the Cumberland facility to be closed on a temporary basis to make sure that we don’t see these violations, but we want to make sure there is a thorough review of Envigo’s facilities elsewhere around the country.”

Suspension and Temporary Restraining Order 
The U.S. Department of Justice filed a complaint against Envigo in federal district court on May 19, 2022, seeking an injunction to stop Envigo from breeding, selling, or otherwise dealing in beagles at its Cumberland, Virginia, facility. The complaint recited the long-term serious violations of federal law by Envigo and hundreds of deaths of animals at their hands, often occurring in brutal circumstances. The government also seized nearly 150 beagles from the site that were in desperate need of medical treatment denied by Envigo.

U.S. District Court Judge Norman Moon issued an emergency order imposing a series of restrictions on Envigo. Judge Moon said the evidence from federal inspections of the Envigo puppy factory shows that more than 300 beagle puppies have died there over the last seven months of unknown causes. He also said in his order that nursing beagles were denied adequate food, and puppies were euthanized without anesthesia.

“[T]he Government’s veterinarians continue to examine dogs throughout the weekend” there, and the number of dogs seized “is likely to grow,” according to the ruling. Beagles have been found with “significant and serious health conditions, including wounds … swollen or enflamed paws, or … dental disease” and “many more beagles still face inadequate food and water, veterinary care, and the other torturous conditions described.” This week, “investigators observed ‘widespread fighting’ between beagles sharing food sources … [and] beagles fighting between adjacent cages.” According to the court, “In multiple enclosures, puppies were unable to access the spigots to get water on their own, and when the investigator ‘held down the spigot to release water,’ the puppies ‘immediately rushed to the spigot to get water and drank heavily and quickly.’" Investigators also found numerous beagles trapped in cage floors, one whose jaw was stuck in the cage bars, and unhygienic conditions including insects, mold and a buildup of old food.

“[T]he Government has provided sufficient evidence that Envigo is engaged in serious and ongoing violations of the Animal Welfare Act, and that an immediate temporary restraining order must issue to put a halt to such violations pending further proceedings,” Judge Moon wrote.

Envigo has denied the allegations and says it is “fully cooperating with DOJ and other involved authorities.”

Settlement and the adoption of nearly 4000 beagles 
In a settlement reached in July 2022, Envigo agreed to no longer engage in activities at the Cumberland site that require an Animal Welfare Act license and to relinquish the nearly 4000 beagles at the facility to the Humane Society of the United States. The company was also ordered to pay a portion of the adoptions costs. The remainder of the costs were covered by dog rescue charities. This represents the largest animal welfare seizure in the Humane Society's 67-year history. The Humane Society transported the dogs to a network of shelters across the United States and by September 1, 2022 all of the dogs had been adopted. One of the beagles rescued from Envigo, a six-year-old female named Momma Mia, was adopted by Meghan, the Duchess of Sussex and Prince Harry. Another rescued puppy named Morty was adopted by New Jersey Governor Phil Murphy and is now the First Dog of New Jersey.

Envigo products and services

Biological products 
Collections of biological products from laboratory animals are raised under closely defined conditions to protect research and research animals. Models are regularly monitored and fed controlled, natural-ingredient diets to minimize lot-to-lot variation.

Contract breeding 
Customer research programs require plan development and execution — which may include cryopreservation (embryo and sperm), genotyping and zygosity, rederivation (speed rederivation), revitalization and speed congenics.

Custom antibody production 
A multi-phased process producing monoclonal or polyclonal antibodies to enhance customer research, diagnostic or therapeutic applications. Tailored programs use the in vivo approach, in vitro production method and hybridoma development to enhance customer research, diagnostic or therapeutic applications which include ancillary services like downstream antibody and purification processes.

Full spectrum health monitoring 
A quality assurance system to assess, design, test, report, interpret and support facility managers in the maintenance of healthy, laboratory animal populations critical to research integrity. The microbiological quality of animal models may influence animal welfare and the validity and reproducibility of research data. Microbiologists, (molecular) biologists and veterinarians perform these health surveillance services, optimally, in diagnostic laboratories certified by the International Organization for Standardization (ISO).

Genetic testing 
This includes genotyping, zygosity testing, gene expression analysis, high-throughput screening services, large-scale single nucleotide polymorphism analysis, sequencing services and storage.

Genetically engineered models and services (GEMS) 
Customization of rodent model genetics to customer specifications through gene deletion, insertion and other modifications. GEMS provides pre-developed transgenic rodent models (gene knock-in or gene knockout) and support custom breeding, cryopreservation and recovery and rapid colony expansion.

Research model support and services 
Studies with emphasis on animal-based research continue to trend toward research model diversity, functional genomics, gene therapy, cancer biology, aging, infectious disease, neurobiology and more. Products include, but are not limited to, aged models, ocular-ready models and pre-conditioned models (husbandry and diet specific). Services include contract breeding and maintenance, social housing solutions, cryopreservation (embryo and sperm), genotyping and zygosity, rederivation (speed rederivation), revitalization and speed congenics.

Surgically modified models

Teklad diet, bedding and enrichment 
Envigo's Teklad business unit provides both high-fat and control diets mostly used in research on the impact of obesity and nutrition on disease states like diabetes, cancer and heart disease.

Tumor models 
Tumor models and studies using cell line-derived xenografts (CDX) and highly characterized patient derived xenografts (PDX) for breast cancer and melanoma. Studies may also include different strains, ovariectomized models and untreated tumors. Clients may receive weekly updates and end of study samples for final report supplementation with syngeneic, tolerability and pharmacokinetic/pharmacodynamic (PK/PD) studies.

References 

Life sciences
Companies based in Indianapolis
Animal testing
Animal welfare